"Our Unsung Villains" is a 1956 episode of Disneyland which originally aired on ABC on February 15, 1956. It was repeated on June 10, 1960.

Synopsis
The episode has Walt Disney handing over the hosting duties to the Magic Mirror, who promptly decides to do a show devoted to the Disney villains. Hans Conried plays the Magic Mirror from Snow White and the Seven Dwarfs and would reprise the role in many Disney television specials, including the 1977 follow-up episode "Disney's Greatest Villains." In this episode, the Magic Mirror only focuses on four villains, whereas he covers twelve in "Disney's Greatest Villains."

Featured villains
 Big Bad Wolf – Three Little Wolves (1936)
 The Evil Queen – Snow White and the Seven Dwarfs (1937)
 Brer Fox and Brer Bear – Song of the South (1946)
 Captain Hook – Peter Pan (1953)

Credits
 Disney's Sing-Along Songs I Love to Laugh clips courtesy of Walt Disney Home Video

See also
 "Halloween Hall o' Fame" (1977)
 "Disney's Greatest Villains" (1977)
 "Disney's Greatest Villains" (1984)
 "Disney's Halloween Treat" (1982)
 "A Disney Halloween" (1983)
 "Scary Tales" (1986, varies)
Mickey's House of Villains (2002)
Once Upon a Halloween (2005)

References

External links
 

1956 American television episodes
Walt Disney anthology television series episodes
Television episodes directed by Hamilton Luske